Shadrach Roundy (January 1, 1789 – July 4, 1872 ) was an early Latter Day Saint leader born in Rockingham, Vermont. Roundy was the second oldest (59) member of Brigham Young's Company, which arrived in the Salt Lake Valley in 1847, and was one of the advance party which arrived in the valley ahead of the main party in order to start planting crops. He was one of the three men who, on July 23, 1847, were the first Mormon pioneers recorded to plow soil in what became Utah.

He was a bishop in Winter Quarters, Nebraska, a member of the first High Council organized in the Salt Lake Valley, again a bishop in Salt Lake City, a senator in the first legislature of the provisional State of Deseret.

Role during Mormon expulsion from Missouri

Roundy played a very important part in the removal of the Latter Day Saints from Missouri. So much of the Mormons' property had been either destroyed or taken over by mobocrats that a number of destitute refugees found it impossible to move themselves and families to safety. The timing of the expulsion during the winter of 1838-39 also greatly aggravated conditions, but the more fortunate promised to assist those in need.  Quoting from a meeting held at Far West on January 29, 1839:

Roundy was the ninth to sign the covenant, which bound the signers to give freely of all their "available property, to be disposed of by a committee who shall be appointed for the purpose of providing means for the removing from this State of the poor and destitute who shall be considered worthy, till there shall not be one left who desires to remove from the State." Accordingly, a committee composed of Roundy and six others directed the removal of the exiles, and provided means of conveyance, food, clothing, and temporary shelters for the destitute.

Nauvoo Years (1839–46)
After their removal from Missouri, the majority of Latter Day Saints fled to Western Illinois, eventually concentrating at Commerce (renamed Nauvoo), Hancock County, Illinois. Although the Latter Day Saints were only in Hancock County for seven years, it provided a home where they experienced many changes and developments. During this time period Roundy was active in both civil and ecclesiastical affairs. Roundy was a member of the Nauvoo Police force beginning in 1843. He was also one of twelve men on the Board of Control for the Nauvoo Agricultural and Mechanical (or Manufacturing) Association. Roundy protected Joseph Smith on at least two occasions. Once, while a group of men led by William Law tried to enter the Smith home Roundy held them back with his cane. On another occasion he accompanied Smith to Monmouth, Illinois, for a trial. Roundy helped prepare the Red Brick Store for some of the first endowments performed in Nauvoo. Shortly before the exodus from Nauvoo, Roundy was assigned to explore California (apparently the plan was never carried out) as an option for settlement in the West opposed to the Great Basin.

Latter life in Utah
Roundy was bishop of the 16th Ward in Salt Lake City from 1849 until 1856. Roundy died in Salt Lake City.  He is the 3rd great-grandfather of The Real Housewives of Salt Lake City cast member Whitney Rose.

Notes

References 
Pollock, Gail SHADRACH TREKS WESTWARD,  

1789 births
1872 deaths
American leaders of the Church of Jesus Christ of Latter-day Saints
Bodyguards
Clergy from Salt Lake City
Doctrine and Covenants people
Latter Day Saints from Missouri
Latter Day Saints from Utah
Latter Day Saints from Vermont
Mormon pioneers